This is a list of the mayors of the town of Newmarket, Ontario as well as the reeves of the village by the same name.

Reeves of the Village of Newmarket 
 1858: Donald Sutherland
 1859: Dr. James Hunter
 1860: Donald Sutherland
 1861: Dr. James Hunter
 1862: Dr. Thomas Pyne
 1863 - 1866: Alfred Boultbee
 1867: Dr. James Hunter
 1868: Samuel Roadhouse
 1869 - 1870: Nelson Gorham
 1871 - 1875: Erastus Jackson
 1876: William Ashworth
 1877 - 1880: Erastus Jackson

Mayors of the Town of Newmarket 
 1881 - 1889  William Cane
 1890 - 1891  Erastus Jackson
 1891 - 1893  Col. T.H. Lloyd
 1894 - 1896  T.J. Robertson
 1897 - 1904  H.S. Cane
 1905 - 1907  N.J. Roadhouse
 1908 - 1911  P.W. Pearson
 1912 - 1913  E.S. Cane
 1913 - 1914  Lt.Col. J.A.W. Allan
 1917 - 1921  W.H. Eves
 1922 - 1924  W.H.S. Cane
 1925 - 1926  J.E. Nesbitt
 1927 - A. Brock Currey
 1928 - 1930  A.J. Davis
 1931 - 1933  J.E. Nesbitt
 1934 - 1941  Dr. S.J. Boyd
 1942 - 1947  Dr. Lowell Dales
 1947 - 1953  Joseph Vale
 1954 - 1957  Herbert Gladman
 1958 - 1959  Alexander Beligin
 1960 - 1961  James Otton
 1962 - 1966  Bert Kent
 1967 - 1968  Andrew Doak
 1969 - 1970  Thomas Surgeoner
 1971 - 1978  Robert Forhan
 1979 to Feb 19, 1979  Robert Scott
 1979 - 1994  Ray Twinney
 1994 - 1997  John Cole
 1997 - 2006  Tom Taylor
 2007 - 2018  Tony Van Bynen
 2018 - present  John Taylor

Newmarket